Léonard Misonne (1 July 1870  14 September 1943) was a Belgian pictorialist photographer. He is known for his landscapes and street scenes with atmospheric skies.

Early life
Born to a wealthy family in Gilly, Belgium in 1870, Léonard Misonne was one of many children of Adèle Pirmez and lawyer and industrialist Louis Misonne. He studied Greek and humanities in Charleroi before going to the Université catholique de Louvain where he got a degree in mining engineering. However, he did not become a mining engineer in the long term.

Photography

Misonne is best known for his atmospheric photographs of landscapes and street scenes, with light as a key feature, and as a pioneer of pictorialism. According to the Directory of Belgian Photographers, "Misonne’s work is characterised by a masterly treatment of light and atmospheric conditions. His images express poetic qualities, but sometimes slip into an anecdotal sentimentality." He was nicknamed "the Corot of photography".

Misonne devoted himself to photography from 1896, joining the Belgian Photography Association in 1897. He became a leading light in pictorialism, frequently exhibiting his photographs at exhibitions. He also did slide shows. Much of his photography was in Belgium and the Netherlands, but he also visited London, France, Germany and Switzerland. The German occupation of Belgium during World War II greatly restricted his photography.

Techniques
Misonne would often photograph things that were strongly illuminated from behind, producing a halo effect.
He would also retouch the lighting effects in his photographs, experimenting with and using many techniques, such as the Fresson process and later the bromoil and mediobrome processes. He also invented the "flou-net" and "photo-dessin" processes.

Quotes

Personal life
Misonne married Louise Valentine Lambin in 1906, and they had several children. He supported himself with the family fortune.

Misonne was a keen cyclist, winning some races.

Misonne suffered severely from asthma throughout his life, and died in Gilly in 1943.

Bibliography
 Tableaux photographiques, by Léonard Misonne, 1927

Gallery

Notes

References

Belgian photographers
Landscape photographers
Pictorialists
1870 births
1943 deaths